Van Dyne is an unincorporated community and census-designated place in the town of Friendship, in Fond du Lac County, Wisconsin, United States. At the 2020 census, its population was 292. The road traveling north-south through the community was part of the Yellowstone Trail and later Wisconsin Highway 175; it is now a county highway.

History
The community was first platted by Daniel Van Duyne in 1866, and was a stop for a railroad between Fond du Lac and Oshkosh. A post office has been operating in Van Dyne since 1866.

Demographics

Images

References

Populated places established in 1866
Census-designated places in Fond du Lac County, Wisconsin
Census-designated places in Wisconsin
1866 establishments in Wisconsin